PyRoom is a full-screen writing program, i.e. a full-screen text editor with the purpose of isolating the user from the operating system and other applications. Written using the GTK+ widget toolkit, PyRoom is a clone of the WriteRoom text editor and features "distraction-free writing". Because PyRoom takes up the whole screen, it is "without buttons, widgets, formatting options, menus and with only the minimum of required dialog windows". It is keyboard oriented and can be configured.

Pyroom supports the following keyboard commands:
  - Show help in a new buffer
  - Show buffer information
  - Shows Preferences dialog
  - Create a new buffer
  - Open a file in a new buffer
  - Quit
  - Save current buffer
  - Save current buffer as
  - Close buffer and exit if it was the last buffer
  - Redo last typing
  - Undo last typing
  - Switch to previous buffer
  - Switch to next buffer

References

External links 

CodeRoom, a syntax-highlighting editor inspired by PyRoom

Free text editors
Linux text editors
Text editors that use GTK
Software that uses PyGTK